The 2004 Kentucky Democratic presidential primary was held on May 18 in the U.S. state of Kentucky as one of the Democratic Party's statewide nomination contests ahead of the 2004 presidential election.

Results

References 

Kentucky
Democratic primary
2004